Visa requirements for Luxembourg citizens (also referred to as Luxembourgers) are administrative entry restrictions by the authorities of other states placed on citizens of Luxembourg. As of 13 April 2021, Luxembourgish citizens had visa-free or visa on arrival access to 190 countries and territories, ranking the Luxembourg passport 4th in terms of travel freedom (tied with Finland, Italy, and Spain) according to the Henley Passport Index. Additionally, the World Tourism Organization also published a report on 15 January 2016 ranking the Luxembourg passport 1st in the world (tied with Denmark, Finland, Germany, Italy, Singapore and the United Kingdom passports) in terms of travel freedom, with the mobility index of 160 (out of 215 with no visa weighted by 1, visa on arrival weighted by 0.7, eVisa by 0.5 and traditional visa weighted by 0).

Visa requirements map

Visa requirements

Territories and disputed areas
Visa requirements for Luxembourgian citizens for visits to various territories, disputed areas, partially recognized countries and restricted zones:

Europe
 — Visa required.
 — Visa required (issued for single entry for 21 days/1/2/3 months or multiple entry visa for 1/2/3 months).Travellers with Artsakh visa (expired or valid) or evidence of travel to Artsakh (stamps) will be permanently denied entry to Azerbaijan.
 Mount Athos — Special permit required (4 days: 25 euro for Orthodox visitors, 35 euro for non-Orthodox visitors, 18 euro for students). There is a visitors' quota: maximum 100 Orthodox and 10 non-Orthodox per day and women are not allowed.
 Brest and Grodno — Visa not required for 10 days.
 Crimea — Visa issued by Russia is required.
 — Visa free access for 3 months. Passport required.
 UN Buffer Zone in Cyprus — Access Permit is required for travelling inside the zone, except Civil Use Areas.
 — Visa not required.
 — Visa not required.
 – Visa not required.
  – Visa not required.
  – Visa not required.
 — Visa not required.
 Jan Mayen — permit issued by the local police required for staying for less than 24 hours and permit issued by the Norwegian police for staying for more than 24 hours.
 – Visa not required.
 — visa free for 90 days.
 Closed cities and regions in Russia — special authorization required.
 — Visa free. Multiple entry visa to Russia and three-day prior notification are required to enter South Ossetia.
 — Visa free. Registration required after 24h.

Africa
  (outside Asmara) — visa covers Asmara only; to travel in the rest of the country, a Travel Permit for Foreigners is required (20 Eritrean nakfa).
 (Western Sahara controlled territory) — Visa not required up to 3 months.
 — Visa issued on arrival (30 days for 30 US dollars, payable on arrival).
 — All foreigners traveling more than 25 kilometers outside of Khartoum must obtain a travel permit.
 Darfur — Separate travel permit is required.

Asia
 — Visa not required for 90 days.
 — Protected Area Permit (PAP) required for whole states of Nagaland and Sikkim and parts of states Manipur, Arunachal Pradesh, Uttaranchal, Jammu and Kashmir, Rajasthan, Himachal Pradesh. Restricted Area Permit (RAP) required for all of Andaman and Nicobar Islands and parts of Sikkim. Some of these requirements are occasionally lifted for a year.
 — Visa on arrival for 15 days is available at Erbil and Sulaymaniyah airports.
 — Special permission required for the town of Baikonur and surrounding areas in Kyzylorda Oblast, and the town of Gvardeyskiy near Almaty.
 Kish Island — Visitors to Kish Island do not require a visa.
 — Visa not required for 90 days.
 Sabah and Sarawak — These states have their own immigration authorities and passport is required to travel to them, however the same visa applies.
 Maldives — With the exception of the capital Malé, tourists are generally prohibited from visiting non-resort islands without the express permission of the Government of Maldives.
 outside Pyongyang – People are not allowed to leave the capital city, tourists can only leave the capital with a governmental tourist guide (no independent moving)
 — Visa not required. Arrival by sea to Gaza Strip not allowed.
 — Visa not required for 90 days.
 Gorno-Badakhshan Autonomous Province — OIVR permit required (15+5 Tajikistani Somoni) and another special permit (free of charge) is required for Lake Sarez.
 — A special permit, issued prior to arrival by Ministry of Foreign Affairs, is required if visiting the following places: Atamurat, Cheleken, Dashoguz, Serakhs and Serhetabat.
 Tibet Autonomous Region — Tibet Travel Permit required (10 US Dollars).
 Korean Demilitarized Zone — restricted zone.
 UNDOF Zone and Ghajar — restricted zones.
 Phú Quốc — can visit without a visa for up to 30 days.
 — Special permission needed for travel outside Sana’a or Aden.

Caribbean and North Atlantic

 — Visa not required for 3 months.
 — Visa not required for 30 days.
 Bonaire, St. Eustatius and Saba — Visa not required for 3 months.
 — Visa not required for 21 days (extendable).
 — Visa not required for 1 month (extendable).
 — Visa not required for 6 months.
 — Visitors arriving at San Andrés and Leticia must buy tourist cards on arrival.
 — Visa not required for 3 months.
 — Visa not required for 6 months.
 — Visa not required.
 Margarita Island — All visitors are fingerprinted.
 — Visa not required under the Visa Waiver Program, for 90 days on arrival from overseas for 2 years. ESTA required.
 — Visa not required.
 — Visa not required for 3 months.
 — Visa not required for 90 days.
 — Visa not required under the Visa Waiver Program, for 90 days on arrival from overseas for 2 years. ESTA required.

Oceania
 — Electronic authorization for 30 days.
 Ashmore and Cartier Islands — special authorisation required.
 Clipperton Island — special permit required.
 — Visa free access for 31 days.
 Lau Province — Special permission required.
 — Visa not required.
 — Visa not required under the Visa Waiver Program, for 90 days on arrival from overseas for 2 years. ESTA required.
 — Visa not required for 3 months.
 — Visa on arrival valid for 30 days is issued free of charge.
 — Visa not required.
 — 14 days visa free and landing fee US$35 or tax of US$5 if not going ashore.
 Entry permit required.
 United States Minor Outlying Islands — special permits required for Baker Island, Howland Island, Jarvis Island, Johnston Atoll, Kingman Reef, Midway Atoll, Palmyra Atoll and Wake Island.
 — Visa not required.

South Atlantic and Antarctica
 — Visitor Permit valid for 4 weeks is issued on arrival.

 — eVisa for 3 months within any year period.
 — Entry Permit (£25) for 183 days is issued on arrival.
 — Permission to land required for 15/30 pounds sterling (yacht/ship passenger) for Tristan da Cunha Island or 20 pounds sterling for Gough Island, Inaccessible Island or Nightingale Islands.
 — Pre-arrival permit from the Commissioner required (72 hours/1 month for 110/160 pounds sterling).
 — Certain countries will deny access to holders of Israeli visas or passport stamps of Israel because of the Arab League boycott of Israel.

Non-ordinary passports

Holders of diplomatic Luxembourg passports have additional visa-free access to Pakistan  and Russia. Holders of diplomatic or service passports of any country have visa-free access to Cape Verde, Ethiopia, Mali and Zimbabwe.

Right to consular protection in non-EU countries

When in a non-EU country where there is no Luxembourg embassy, Luxembourg citizens as EU citizens have the right to get consular protection from the embassy of any other EU country present in that country.

See also List of diplomatic missions of Luxembourg.

Upon request, the authorities of the largely unrecognized Republic of Artsakh may attach their visa and/or stamps to a separate piece of paper in order to avoid detection of travel to their country.

Non-visa restrictions

See also

Visa requirements for the European Union citizens
Luxembourgian passport

References and notes
References

Notes

Luxembourg
Foreign relations of Luxembourg